Ibrahim Sissoko (born 27 November 1995) is a professional footballer who plays as a forward for Sochaux. Born in France, he also holds Malian citizenship.

Club career
Sissoko joined Béziers in the 2017–18 season and was one of their key players in helping them get promoted into the Ligue 2. He signed with FC Lorient in the summer of 2018, and returned on loan to Béziers, where he made his professional debut in a 2–0 Ligue 2 win over AS Nancy on 27 July 2018. He returned to Lorient in December 2018. Sissoko left Niort at the end of the 2021–22 season, having scored 26 goals in 52 appearances for the club in all competitions.

On 30 June 2022, Sissoko signed a four-year contract with Sochaux.

International career
Born in France, Sissoko is of Malian descent. He was called up to the Mali national team for 2022 World Cup qualification matches in March 2022.

Career statistics

References

External links
 
 ASB Profile 
 LFP Profile
 FCL Profile
 SSG Profile

1995 births
Living people
Sportspeople from Créteil
French footballers
French sportspeople of Malian descent
Chamois Niortais F.C. players
FC Lorient players
AS Béziers (2007) players
SAS Épinal players
Entente SSG players
FC Sochaux-Montbéliard players
Ligue 2 players
Championnat National players
Championnat National 2 players
Association football forwards
Footballers from Val-de-Marne